Ida Gabrielsson (born 1981) is a Swedish politician. Since September 2018, she serves as Member of the Riksdag. She was again elected as Member of the Riksdag in September 2022. She represents the constituency of Stockholm Municipality. She represented Stockholm County from 2018 to 2022. She is affiliated with the Left Party. Since 2020, she has been the deputy chairman of the Left Party.

References 

Living people
1981 births
Place of birth missing (living people)
21st-century Swedish politicians
21st-century Swedish women politicians
Members of the Riksdag 2018–2022
Members of the Riksdag 2022–2026
Members of the Riksdag from the Left Party (Sweden)
Women members of the Riksdag